Lozotaenia melanophragma is a species of moth of the  family Tortricidae. It is found in the Democratic Republic of Congo.

References

Moths described in 1936
Archipini